Star Trek: New Frontier is a series of interlinked novels written by Peter David, published by Simon & Schuster imprints, Pocket Books, Pocket Star, and Gallery Books, from 1997 to 2015. New Frontier was the first Star Trek tie-in fiction property not to be based on a television series. The series was created by John J. Ordover.

New Frontier is concurrent with Next Generation, Deep Space Nine, and Voyager television series and their tie-in book lines.

Production 
John J. Ordover said in Voyages of Imagination (2009), "One of the major problems with the novels at the time [the mid-nineties] … was you couldn't put any inherent continuity into them and you couldn’t make any significant changes, so characters couldn’t die, they couldn't change, they couldn't leave. The core characters always had to remain the same. After a few years, that gets frustrating for an editor." Ordover devised New Frontier to accomplish what he couldn't with the other Star Trek book lines—to create a serialized, internally consistent, series of novels set in the Star Trek universe. According to Peter David, "Paramount's belief was that there would be little to no interest from the fans in a [Star Trek] series that did not stem directly from the [television] shows." He was given "their blessing", with the caveat a number of characters from the Next Generation were to be included.

“Peter David made up MacKenzie Calhoun on his own," said Ordover. He told me the characters he wanted to use and I was allowed to run with it." David then "fleshed out the concept and created the original characters."

Four novels were published in paperback novella format in 1997, similar to the release of The Green Mile by Stephen King. An omnibus was published in 1998. The novels that followed were published in mass-market paperback format. No Limits (2003), an anthology of short stories edited by David, was published in trade paperback format.

WildStorm published a graphic novel in 2000, written by David, with artists Mike Collins and David Roach. A five-issue comic book miniseries was published by IDW Publishing in 2008, also by David, with artist Stephen Thompson.

In total, twenty four novels, a short story anthology, and two graphic novels, have been published , in addition to several short stories, and related works, by other writers. Characters and settings from New Frontier have appeared appear in other Star Trek novels, most of which were written by David. Novels have been included in crossovers with other Star Trek book lines, such as: The Captain's Table (1998), Double Helix (1999) Gateways (2000), The Lost Era (2003), and the Mirror Universe (2007–2009) anthologies. A short story by David was anthologized in the Tales of the Dominion War (2004), edited by Keith DeCandido.

The Returned (2015), the most recent installment of the series, was published as a three-part ebook exclusive by Pocket Star.

Premise 

Characters 

The characters in New Frontier are an amalgam of characters from the Animated Series, Next Generation, David's trilogy of young adult Starfleet Academy novels, and new characters created for the series. The series is written in an ensemble-cast style, similar to a television series. However, the primary characters are Calhoun, Commander Elizabeth Shelby, and Vulcan medical officer Dr. Selar.

Ships 
New Frontier follows the crews of several Starfleet ships:
 : The Excalibur is an Ambassador-class starship, originally captained by Morgan Korsmo. Command is passed to Mackenzie Calhoun at the start of the series. The Excalibur is destroyed in Dark Allies (1999).
 : Commander Elizabeth Shelby is promoted to captain of the Exeter in Restoration (2000). The ship's command is later passed to Alexandra Garbeck when Shelby is promoted to command of the Excalibur-A.
 : A Galaxy-class explorer launched to replace the previous Ambassador-class starship of the same name.
 : Shelby's second command; a Galaxy-class starship assigned to accompany the Excalibur-A. Command of the Trident passed to Katerina Mueller following Shelby's promotion to fleet command.

Reception 
Katherine Trendacosta of io9 said New Frontier filled in "a gap in the [Star Trek] universe that you didn’t even realize was there. And it did it all while being fun and smartly written." She said the character Calhoun is "so perfect he feels like a stealth parody of a Mary Sue." Dan Gunther, in his review of Cold Wars (2001), said "David has a solid handle on his characters."

Alison Baumgartner of ScienceFiction.com described New Frontier as having "all the space adventuring" of the Next Generation and Original Series, "mixed with all the political intrigue of Deep Space Nine, making it the best of all possible Star Trek worlds."

Novels 

All novels published as paperback editions, except where indicated.

Numbered novels 
Novels are inconsistently numbered among primary sources.

Original novels 
Original and crossover novels written by Peter David.

Omnibus editions 
Published by Simon & Schuster.

Short fiction 
Collections that include New Frontier short fiction. All written by Peter, except those collected in No Limits (2003).

No Limits (2003) 
Star Trek: New FrontierNo Limits (2003) collected stories written by popular Star Trek tie-in fiction writers and friends of Peter David. Each story is presented from the perspective of members of the Excalibur crew. "Making a Difference", by Mary Scott-Wiecek, is a retelling of the Battle of Wolf 359.

Mirror Universe (2007–2009) 
Two collected works, written by David, set in the Mirror Universe.

Graphic novels

Double Time (2000) 

Star Trek: New FrontierDouble Time (2000) is a single-issue, square bound, graphic novel published by WildStorm. Written by Peter David, with artists Michael Collins and David Roach. The title does not appear on the cover or spine, only the Star Trek: New Frontier word mark.

Turnaround (2008) 

Star Trek: New FrontierTurnaround is a five-issue miniseries written by Peter David, with artist Stephen Thompson. Published by IDW Publishing.

Related novels 
Characters and settings from New Frontier appear in other Star Trek book lines:

The Next Generation (1991–2007) 
Star Trek: The Next Generation novels which include characters from New Frontier:

Starfleet Academy (1993) 
Star Trek: The Next GenerationStarfleet Academy young adult series explores the lives of the  crew as Starfleet Academy cadets. Three novellas written by Peter David tie into New Frontier

Science Fiction Book Club 
Omnibus editions published exclusively for the Science Fiction Book Club. New Frontier (1998) is very similar to the edition published by Pocket Books the following month. Prometheans (1998) is a book club exclusive.

See also 
 List of Star Trek novels
 List of Star Trek: The Next Generation novels

Notes

References

External links 
 
 

Book series introduced in 1997
Novels by Peter David
New Frontier
New Frontier
Science fiction book series